Russula rosea (synonym Russula lepida), known as the rosy russula, is a north temperate, commonly found mushroom of the large "brittlegill" genus Russula.

The cap is convex when young, later flat, mostly bright cinnabar to carmine red; often with yellow spots and up to 10 cm in diameter. The gills are pale straw-yellow, brittle, and occasionally with a red edge at the rim of the cap. The spores are pale-cream. The stem is usually flushed carmine, but can be pure white. The flesh is hard and bitter-tasting; some consider it edible, others inedible.

This mushroom is commonly found in coniferous forests or near beech trees.

Similar species
The rare Russula pseudointegra is distinguished by its hot-tasting flesh. Red-stemmed forms of R. rosea could also be confused with Russula xerampelina, but the latter has softer flesh and no woody flavour.

See also
List of Russula species

References

E. Garnweidner. Mushrooms and Toadstools of Britain and Europe. Collins. 1994

External links

rosea
Fungi described in 1796
Fungi of Europe